Anetan is a district in the Pacific island nation of Nauru. It lies in Anetan Constituency.

Geography
It is one of the smallest districts. The population is about 880.

Main sights
This district contains State House – the official residence of the President, and the weather station of the island.

Education

Anetan Infant School is in Anetan. The primary and secondary schools serving all of Nauru are Yaren Primary School in Yaren District (years 1–3), Nauru Primary School in Meneng District (years 4–6), Nauru College in Denigomodu District (years 7–9), and Nauru Secondary School (years 10–12) in Yaren District.

Notable people
The former President of Nauru Marcus Stephen, who took office in 2007, is a member of the Parliament of Nauru representing the Anetan and Ewa constituency.

See also
List of settlements in Nauru

References

External links

Districts of Nauru
Populated places in Nauru